The world tag team championship is the name usually given to the primary tag team championships in professional wrestling promotions.

Nomenclature 
The name of the promotion is often preceded to the term "world tag team championship" as the complete name of the title. Examples of this included the ECW World Tag Team, WCW World Tag Team, and WWF World Tag Team Championship. However, some are also correctly known simply as the "World Tag Team Championship" without bearing the name of an organization. In some cases, this occurs in organizations where other world tag team championships are also competed for, as was the case in WCW in the early 1990s and WWE in the 2000s. The term "world tag team championship" can apply to any world tag team championship in general or to a specific one in particular, though this often creates confusion over which tag team championship is being referenced when the term is used.

Due to the variations of tag team wrestling, other World Tag Team Championships may exclude the "tag team" portion of the name and use a more suitable term such as "trios" or "six-man tag" to indicate a championship for tag teams with three members.

Promotions can also recognize subordinate titles to World Tag Team Championships that are often designated as regional, national, or international championships. Examples of these subordinate titles include the NWA Canadian Tag Team Championship and WWF International Tag Team Championship, which are national and international subordinates respectively.

A professional wrestling championship is not won or lost competitively, but instead the championship is scripted by the decision of the bookers of a wrestling promotion. The title is awarded after the chosen champion "wins" a match to maintain the illusion that professional wrestling is a competitive sport.

Examples of active world tag team championships

Examples of inactive world tag team championships

See also 
 Professional wrestling championship
 Tag team

References

External links 
 Pro-Wrestling World Tag Team Championship Histories

it:World Tag Team Championship
nl:World Tag Team Championship
ja:WWE・世界タッグチーム王座